Atiyah ibn Sa'd ibn Junādah al‐'Awfi [d. 729] was an early Muslim scholar of Islam. He is regarded as a reliable narrator of hadith. An aged supporter of rebels and a Shia notable of the time, a disciple of the companion of Prophet Jabir ibn Abd Allah al-Ansari and a famous narrator of Hadith, Atiyya ibn Sa'd Awfi was arrested by Muhammad bin Qasim on the orders of Al-Hajjaj and demanded that he curse Ali on the threat of punishment. Atiyya refused to curse Ali and was punished. While Maclean doesn't give the details of the punishment, early historians like Ibn Hajar Al-asqalani and Tabari record that he was flogged by 400 lashes and his head and beard shaved for humiliation and that he fled to Khurasan and returned to Iraq after the ruler had been changed.

Family background
Atiyah belonged to the Judaila family of the tribe known as Qays and his patronymic appellation was Abu al-Hasan according to al-Tabari. Atiyah's mother was Greek. Some accounts suggest that she was a Roman slave girl.

Sa'd bin Junadah i.e. the father of Atiyah is reported to have approached Ali, the fourth caliph and the cousin of the prophet Mohammed, and asked him to name him. Ali said: "He is an atiyah (Arabic for gift) of Allah". Thus he was named Atiyah.

Lifetime and legacy

Arba'een Walk 

After the battle of Karbala, the companion of Prophet Muhammad, Jabir ibn Abdullah Al-Ansari  and his disciple Atiyah ibn Sa'd were the first pilgrims to visit the grave of Hussain ibn Ali in Karbala. Hearing the news of what had happened, they left Medina to pay homage and reached Karbala on the 20th of the Islamic month of Safar. This event has evolved into a religious pilgrimage, known as the Arba'een, attended by millions of Muslims every year.

Revolt of Al-Ash'ath 
Atiyah supported the revolt of Al-Ash'ath and his campaign against al-Hajjāj, the Umayyad viceroy of Iraq under Caliph Al-Walid I. The revolt was suppressed and  Al-Ash’ath was killed in 85 AH. after which Atiyah fled to Fars. Al-Hajjāj ordered Muhammad bin Qasim then governor of Fars, to summon Atiyah and demand him to curse Ali, which was a practice used by the Umayyads as a test of loyalty. If Atiyah refused, he was to be flogged four hundred times and his head and beard shaved as humiliation. Al-Tabari narrates that Atiyah refused to curse Ali and he was punished. According to Chachnama, he was the commander of the right wing of bin Qasim's army after the conquest of Armabil (modern Bela). Modern historians, like Yohanan Friedmann and André Wink, question the historical authenticity of this claim in Chachnama. Friedmann writes:-

 "One of the most conspicuous elements of this kind is the large number of warriors and traditionists (scholars of Hadith) who figure in the Chachnama and are absent in other accounts of the conquest".

Other early historians like Ibn Hajar Al-Asqalani and Tabari record that he moved on to Khurasan and returned to Iraq after the ruler had been changed.

Khorasan 
Al-Tabari's biography states that Atiyah moved to Khorasan and stayed there during the governorship of Qutayba ibn Muslim. After the accession of Yazid II and the appointment of Umar ibn Hubayra as the Governor of Iraq (in 103 AH / 721–722 CE), he sought permission to return to Iraq. He then moved to Kufa lived there until his death in 111 AH / 729 CE.

Scholarly impact
Atiyah ibn Sa'd is regarded as a reliable transmitter of Prophetic narrations, hadith, by Ibn Hajar al-Asqalani and al-Tabari. In addition, he was a great exegete of the Qur'an and wrote a commentary on it in five volumes. He was a student of Abdullah ibn Abbas and Jabir ibn Abd Allah al-Ansari.

References

Bibliography

External links
Ayati, Ibrahim. A Probe Into the History of Ashura. Chapter 48. Published by: Islamic Seminary Publications, Karachi, Pakistan. Available online

8th-century Arabs
8th-century Muslim scholars of Islam
729 deaths
Year of birth unknown
Shia scholars of Islam